Walter L. Budge (March 6, 1906 – December 10, 1961) was an American politician who served as the Attorney General of Utah from 1959 to 1961.

He died of internal bleeding on December 10, 1961, in Salt Lake City, Utah at age 55.

References

1906 births
1961 deaths
Utah Attorneys General
Utah Republicans
People from Paris, Idaho